TV Powww (often stylized as TV POWWW) was a franchised television game show format, in which home viewers controlled a video game via telephone in hopes of winning prizes.

History
The TV Powww format, produced and distributed by Florida syndicator Marvin Kempner, debuted in 1978 on Los Angeles station KABC-TV as part of A.M. Los Angeles, and by the start of the next decade was seen on 79 local television stations (including national superstation WGN as part of Bozo's Circus) in the United States, as well as several foreign broadcasters. While most stations had dropped TV Powww by the mid-1980s, stations in Australia and Italy were still using it as late as 1990.

Stations were originally supplied with games for the Fairchild Channel F console, but following Fairchild's withdrawal from the home video game market, Intellivision games were used. Kempner later unsuccessfully attempted to interest both Nintendo and Sega in a TV Powww revival.

While the underlying technology was standardized across participating stations, the format of TV Powwws presentation varied from market to market. Many presented TV Powww as a series of segments that ran during the commercial breaks of television programming (a la Dialing for Dollars), while some (such as KTTV in Los Angeles) presented TV Powww as a standalone program.

Gameplay
In the video game being featured, the at-home player would give directions over the phone while watching the game on their home screen. When the viewer determined that the weapon was aiming at the target, they said "Pow!", after which that weapon would activate.

Accounts vary as to what kind of controller technology was involved. Some sources state that the gaming consoles sent to the stations were modified for voice activation., while a 2008 WPIX station retrospective reported that stations without the special voice-activation-equipped consoles would have an employee in the control room manually hit the fire button when the caller said "Pow!" (or "Pix" (pronounced picks) in WPIX's case).

One of the pitfalls of the gameplay was that, due to broadcasting technicalities, there was significant lag in the transmission of a television signal. The player would experience this lag when playing at home, which likely made playing the game somewhat more difficult. (For similar reasons, such a game would be impossible in digital television without the use of a second video chat feed for the player, due to the time it takes to process and compress the video stream; most stations also mandate a seven-second delay to prevent obscenities from reaching the air.)

Featured games

Channel F

There is video evidence for the following Fairchild Channel F games being played on TV Powww:
 Baseball
 Bowling
 Quadra-Doodle (used as a background)
 Shooting Gallery

Kempner marketing documentation also supports the following games being used:
 Dodge' It
 Maze
 Tic-Tac-Toe

Intellivision

There is video evidence for the following Intellivision games being played on TV Powww:
 Football
 Slots
 Soccer
 Single player Space Battle
 Two player Space Battle

Kempner marketing documentation and Marvin Kempner's autobiography suggest the following games were available or under development:
 Astrosmash
 Baseball
 Basketball
 Boxing
 Frog Bog
 Horse Racing
 Skiing
 Space Hawk
 Word Fun - Word Rockets
 Unspecified Intellivoice games

The Intellivision title Sharp Shot reportedly comprised four TV Powww games, implying that the simplified versions of the following titles found on this cartridge were also available to TV Powww customers:

 Advanced Dungeons & Dragons
 Sea Battle

TV Powww variants

TV Pixxx
One notable version of TV Powww was used by New York based television station WPIX, called TV-Pixxx (a play on the station's call letters). Hosted by station staff announcer Ralph Lowenstein, it was aired during the traditional weekday afternoon slot of children's TV as an interlude. Participants would be called at home to play a videogame that appeared on their screen.

Participants interacted with the game by saying the word "Pix" to perform game-related actions. Prizes included T-shirts and $10 U.S. savings bonds. They could double their prize or win a bonus prize (such as advance tickets to see upcoming films) by guessing a "Magic Word" (originally common everyday words, later in the last two years one of the 50 U.S. states). For a chance at playing, children could send a postcard with their name, address, and phone number to TV Pixxx.

WPIX's program lasted until 1982; for many New York viewers, TV Pixxx was their first glimpse of the Intellivision home game system.

In the Beastie Boys Book, Michael Diamond claimed to be a regular viewer of the program, but was never picked to play the game, nor saw anyone actually win.

Switchback
Switchback aired on CBC Television station CBRT in Calgary, Alberta in 1985, also including Intellivision games.

Zap
Zap aired in the mornings from 1978 to 1979 on Cleveland, Ohio NBC station WKYC which had a feature similar to TV Powww.

International versions

Australia
In the early 1980s, Golden West Network (GWN) had a version called TV Powww (or possibly TV Pow), hosted by Chris Mills. There was a spaceship game, a boxing game and a soccer/football game.

A basic version of Space Invaders was broadcast daily after school hours in Rockhampton, north-east coast of Australia during the early 1980s. Children would yell "Pow!" over the telephone, with the host pressing the fire button in the studio. Reaction time varied with the mood of the host. The game was often chaotic, with contestant rapid firing, and sync abandoned when the host was unable to keep up.

Brazil
The game premiered on SBT in August 1984 and its first host was Paulo Barboza. Shortly thereafter, other hosts like Tânia Alves, Mara Maravilha, Luís Ricardo, Sérgio Mallandro, Gugu Liberato and Christina Rocha presented the game. TV Powww! became a segment of the Bozo show in 1986 and continued until 1989.

United Kingdom
The game had a 12 episode run as part of the BBC Saturday morning children's show Get Set For Summer between April 1982 and July 1982.

See also
 The Golden Shot (similar British program with a play-at-home element)

References

Children's game shows
1978 American television series debuts
1990 American television series endings
1970s American game shows
1980s American game shows
1990s American game shows
Intellivision
Franchised television formats
American television shows based on video games
Local game shows in the United States
Sistema Brasileiro de Televisão original programming
Seven Network original programming